The 2019 Russian Men's Curling Championship was held in Sochi from April 15 to 21, 2019.

Teams

Round Robin

Playoffs

Quarterfinals. April 20, 10:30

1st vs 2nd

3rd vs 4th

Semifinal. April 20, 18:00

Bronze Medal Match. April 21, 10:30

Gold Medal Match. April 21, 10:30

Final standings

References

External links
 Video:

See also
2019 Russian Women's Curling Championship
2019 Russian Mixed Curling Championship
2019 Russian Mixed Doubles Curling Championship
2019 Russian Junior Curling Championships
2019 Russian Wheelchair Curling Championship

Curling competitions in Russia
Russian Men's Curling Championship
Curling Men's Championship
Russian Men's Curling Championship
Sports competitions in Sochi